Ranmau is a village in Dalmau block of Rae Bareli district, Uttar Pradesh, India. The nearest large town is Lalganj, which is 8 km away. As of 2011, it has a population of 710 people, in 119 households. It has one primary school and no healthcare facilities.

The 1961 census recorded Ranmau as comprising 1 hamlet, with a total population of 313 people (152 male and 161 female), in 56 households and 47 physical houses. The area of the village was given as 195 acres. There were 5 small shoe manufacturers in the village at that point.

The 1981 census recorded Ranmau as having a population of 463 people, in 77 households, and having an area of 77.70 hectares. The main staple foods were listed as wheat and rice.

References

Villages in Raebareli district